was an autobahn in Germany. Its purpose was to connect the French Autoroute 36 with the German Bundesautobahn 5 via a bridge over the Rhine. At 400 metres, the A 862 was Germany's shortest autobahn; it was later integrated as an onramp into the A 5.

Exit list

External links 

862
A862